The micrometre (international spelling as used by the International Bureau of Weights and Measures; SI symbol: μm) or micrometer (American spelling), also commonly known as a micron, is a unit of length in the International System of Units (SI) equalling  (SI standard prefix "micro-" = ); that is, one millionth of a metre (or one thousandth of a millimetre, or about ).

The nearest smaller common SI unit is the nanometre, equivalent to one thousandth of a micrometre, one millionth of a millimetre or one billionth of a metre.

The micrometre is a common unit of measurement for wavelengths of infrared radiation as well as sizes of biological cells and bacteria, and for grading wool by the diameter of the fibres.

Examples

Between 1 μm and 10 μm:
 1–10 μm – length of a typical bacterium
 3–8 μm – width of strand of spider web silk
 5 μm – length of a typical human spermatozoon's head
 10 μm – size of fungal hyphae
 about 10 μm – size of a fog, mist, or cloud water droplet

Between 10 μm and 100 μm:
 about 10–12 μm – thickness of plastic wrap (cling wrap)
 10 to 55 μm – width of wool fibre
 17 to 181 μm – diameter of human hair
 70 to 180 μm – thickness of paper

SI standardization
The term micron and the symbol μ were officially accepted for use in isolation to denote the micrometre in 1879, but officially revoked by the International System of Units (SI) in 1967. This became necessary because the older usage was incompatible with the official adoption of the unit prefix micro-, denoted μ, during the creation of the SI in 1960.

In the SI, the systematic name micrometre became the official name of the unit, and μm became the official unit symbol.

 Additionally, in American English, the use of "micron" helps differentiate the unit from the micrometer, a measuring device, because the unit's name in mainstream American spelling is a homograph of the device's name. In spoken English, they may be distinguished by pronunciation, as the name of the measuring device is often stressed on the second syllable, whereas the systematic pronunciation of the unit name, in accordance with the convention for pronouncing SI units in English, places the stress on the first syllable.

The plural of micron is normally microns, though micra was occasionally used before 1950.

Symbol 

The official symbol for the SI prefix micro- is a Greek lowercase mu. In Unicode, there is also a micro sign with the code point U+00B5 (µ), distinct from the code point U+03BC (μ) of the Greek letter lowercase mu. According to the Unicode Consortium, the Greek letter character is preferred, but implementations must recognize the micro sign as well. Most fonts use the same glyph for the two characters.

See also 
 Metric prefix
 Metric system
 Orders of magnitude (length)
 Wool measurement

Notes and references

External links 
 

Metre
-06